Vidarunna Mottukal is a 1977 Indian Malayalam-language children's film, produced and directed by P. Subramaniam under the banner Neela Productions. This children's  film bagged a special award for its Director P. Subramaniam in the Kerala State Film awards in the year 1977.

The film stars Madhu, Kaviyoor Ponnamma, Raghavan, Master Santhoshkumar, Kailasnath, S. P. Pillai, Thikkurissi, Pappu, Vanchiyoor Madhavan Nair, Sunny, Ayiroor Sathyan, Kundarabhasi, Chavara V. P. Nair, C. I. Paul, Vijayakumar, N. S. Vanchiyoor, R. C. Nair, Thoppil Ramachandran, Udayan, Sathyan, Master Sai Kumar, Master Rajiv Rangan, Master Jose, Master Ajayakumar, Baby Sumathi, Baby Bindu, Baby Kavitha, Asha Raghavan, Ayisha, Junior Sheela, Pramila Chandran, Rathirani, Baby Swapna, Sajanachandran, Baby Lani Antony, Dr. K. R. Namboothiri, Anandvalli, Kaviyoor Ponnamma, Aranmula Ponnamma, Mallika, Radhamani, Lalithasri, Lalitha, Vijayalakshmi and Baby Ammbika. The film has musical score by G. Devarajan.
This was the debut film of Malayalam actress Menaka.

Cast
Madhu as Headmaster Sathyaseelan
Kaviyoor Ponnamma as Lakshmi
Raghavan as Gopal
Baby Sumathi as Kanchana
Kailasnath as Chandran (Child Artist)
Mallika Sukumaran as School teacher
Sai Kumar as Vikraman (Child Artist)
KPAC Sunny as Sulu's husband
 Radhamani as Sulu
Ambika as Sumam (Child artist)
Anandavally as Ammini
Chavara V. P. Nair as Doctor
S. P. Pillai as Pappan Pillai
C. I. Paul as Hassan
Kuthiravattam Pappu as Madhupan
Lalithasree as Kamakshi
Aranmula Ponnamma as Gopal's mother
Vijayalakshmi as Muthassi
Kalpana as Child artist
Urvashi  as Child artist

Soundtrack
The music was composed by G. Devarajan and the lyrics were written by Sreekumaran Thampi and Bankim Chandra Chatterji.

References

External links
 

1977 films
1970s Malayalam-language films
Films directed by P. Subramaniam